Estunand (also Romanized as Estūnand; also known as Estānend, Estānīd, and Stānind) is a village in Neh Rural District, in the Central District of Nehbandan County, South Khorasan Province, Iran. At the 2006 census, its population was 99, in 35 families.

References 

Populated places in Nehbandan County